Emich or Emicho is a masculine given name of Germanic origin. It is a reduced form of Emmerich. Similar names include Emrich, Emch, Emig,  Amick, Emick. 

Notable people with the name include:

Emicho, also known as Emich of Flonheim, German count and crusader, leader of the Rhineland massacres of Jews in 1096
Emicho I, Count of Nassau-Hadamar (died 1334), also known as Emich
Emich Christian of Leiningen-Dagsburg (1642–1702), Count of Leiningen and Dagsburg and Lord of Broich, Oberstein and Bürgel
Emich Carl, 2nd Prince of Leiningen (1763–1814)
Emich, Prince of Leiningen (1866–1939)
Emich Kyrill, Prince of Leiningen (1926–1991)

See also
Emichones, early medieval noble family in which the name was common

References

German masculine given names